The Azerbaijan Cup 2011–12 is the 20th season of the annual cup competition in Azerbaijan. It started on 26 October 2011 with five games of the Premiliary Round and ended in May 2012 with the final. FC Inter Baku were the defending champions. Twenty-two teams were scheduled to compete in the competition.

The winner of the competition will qualify for the first qualifying round of the 2012–13 UEFA Europa League.

Preliminary round
The games were played on 26 October 2011.

|}

First round
The five winners from the preliminary round joined the remaining eleven teams of the 2011–12 Azerbaijan Premier League in this round and
played against each other over one game. The games were played on 30 November 2011.

|}

Notes
Match Abandoned after Turan refused to restart the game after conceding a disputed goal

Quarterfinals
The eight winners from the first round were drawn into four two-legged ties. 

|}

Semifinals
The four quarterfinal winners were drawn into two two-legged semifinal ties.

|}

Final
The two semifinals winners participated in this stage of the competition.

Scorers
3 goals:
 Juninho, Baku

2 goals:

 Koke, Baku
 Serge Djiehoua, Gabala
 Yuriy Fomenko, Kəpəz
 Ceyhun Sultanov, Kəpəz
 Randall Brenes, Khazar Lankaran
 Cătălin Doman, Khazar Lankaran
 Bahodir Nasimov, Neftchi Baku
 F. Amirguliyev, Şahdag Qusar
 Royal Najafov, Şuşa

1 goal:

 Gheorghe Boghiu, AZAL
 Nugzar Kvirtiya, AZAL
 Shahriyar Rahimov, AZAL
 Orkhan Safiyaroglu, AZAL
 Nasibov, Bakili Baku
 Huseynov, Bakili Baku
 Deividas Česnauskis, Baku
 Lucas Mario Horvat, Baku
 Aleksandar Šolić, Baku
 Saşa Yunisoğlu, Gabala
 Dodo, Gabala
 Victor Mendy, Gabala
 Nizami Hajiyev, Inter Baku
 Ģirts Karlsons, Inter Baku
 Enyo Krastovchev, Inter Baku
 Asif Mirili, Inter Baku
 Bachana Tskhadadze, Inter Baku
 Samir Zargarov, Inter Baku
 Hashimov, Karvan
 Elnur Abdullayev, Khazar Lankaran
 Branimir Subašić, Khazar Lankaran
 Aliyev, Mughan
 Rashad Abdullayev, Neftchi Baku
 Alessandro, Neftchi Baku
 Javid Imamverdiyev, Neftchi Baku
 Amrahov, Neftchala
 Giorgi Adamia, Qarabağ
 Rauf Aliyev, Qarabağ
 Afran Ismayilov, Qarabağ
 Muarem Muarem, Qarabağ
 Leonardo Rocha, Qarabağ
 Bakhtiyar Soltanov, Qarabağ
 Gadimov, Qaradağ
 Tagiyev, Qaradağ
 Alakberov, Qaradağ
 Tayibov, Shahdag Qusar
 Samir Abdulov, Sumgayit
 Kamil Nurahmadov, Sumgayit

References

External links
Azerbaijan Cup at soccerway.com

Azerbaijan Cup seasons
Azerbaijan Cup
Azerbaijan Cup